Imp Years is an EP by The Spinanes. It was released on April 10, 2000. It is a collection of rarities and previously unreleased tracks.

Track listing
 "Suffice" – 3:50
 "Halloween Candy" – 3:34
 "Rummy" – 4:21
 "Hawaiian Baby" – 5:46
 "Messy Shitty" – 3:32
 "Handful Of Hearts" – 4:09

References

2000 EPs
The Spinanes albums